Joe Lokanc (March 11, 1917 – March 30, 2009) was an American football guard. He played for the Chicago Cardinals in 1941.

He died on March 30, 2009, in Naperville, Illinois at age 92.

References

1917 births
2009 deaths
American football guards
Northwestern Wildcats football players
Chicago Cardinals players
Players of American football from Indiana
Sportspeople from East Chicago, Indiana